The University of Bristol is a red brick Russell Group research university in Bristol, England. It received its royal charter in 1909, although it can trace its roots to a Merchant Venturers' school founded in 1595 and University College, Bristol, which had been in existence since 1876.

Bristol is organised into six academic faculties composed of multiple schools and departments running over 200 undergraduate courses, largely in the Tyndalls Park area of the city. The university had a total income of £833.1 million in 2021–22, of which £186.4 million was from research grants and contracts. It is the largest independent employer in Bristol. Current academics include 21 fellows of the Academy of Medical Sciences, 13 fellows of the British Academy, 13 fellows of the Royal Academy of Engineering and 44 fellows of the Royal Society. Among alumni and past faculty, the university counts 9 Nobel laureates.

Bristol is a member of the Russell Group of research-intensive British universities, the European-wide Coimbra Group and the Worldwide Universities Network, of which the university's previous vice-chancellor, Eric Thomas, was chairman from 2005 to 2007. In addition, the university holds an Erasmus Charter, sending more than 500 students per year to partner institutions in Europe. It has an average of 6.4 (Sciences faculty) to 13.1 (Medicine & Dentistry Faculty) applicants for each undergraduate place.

History

Foundation 
The earliest antecedent of the university was the engineering department of the Merchant Venturers' Technical College (founded as a school as early as 1595) which became the engineering faculty of Bristol University. The university was also preceded by Bristol Medical School (1833) and University College, Bristol, founded in 1876, where its first lecture was attended by only 99 students. The university was able to apply for a royal charter due to the financial support of the Wills, Fry and Colston families, who made their fortunes in tobacco plantations, chocolate, and (via Edward Colston) the transatlantic slave trade, respectively. A 2018 study commissioned by the university estimated 85% of the philanthropic funds used for the institution's foundation was directly connected with the transatlantic slave trade.

The royal charter was gained in May 1909, with 288 undergraduates and 400 other students entering the university in October 1909. Henry Overton Wills III became its first chancellor. The University College was the first such institution in the country to admit women on the same basis as men. However, women were forbidden to take examinations in medicine until 1906.

Historical development 

Since the founding of the university itself in 1909, it has grown considerably and is now one of the largest employers in the local area, although it is smaller by student numbers than the nearby University of the West of England. It is a member of the Russell Group of research-led UK universities, the Coimbra Group of leading European universities and the Worldwide Universities Network (WUN).

Early years 

After the founding of the university college in 1876, government support began in 1889. Funding from mergers with the Bristol Medical School in 1893 and the Merchant Venturers' Technical College in 1909, allowed the opening of a new medical school and an engineering school — two subjects that remain among the university's greatest strengths. In 1908, gifts from the Fry and Wills families, particularly £100,000 from Henry Overton Wills III (£6m in today's money), were provided to endow a University for Bristol and the West of England, provided that a royal charter could be obtained within two years. In December 1909, the king granted such a charter and erected the University of Bristol. Henry Wills became its first chancellor and Conwy Lloyd Morgan the first vice-chancellor. Wills died in 1911 and in tribute his sons George and Harry built the Wills Memorial Building, starting in 1913 and finally finishing in 1925. Today, it houses parts of the academic provision for earth sciences and law, and graduation ceremonies are held in its Great Hall. The Wills Memorial Building is a Grade II* listed building.

In 1920, George Wills bought the Victoria Rooms and endowed them to the university as a students' union.
The building now houses the Department of Music and is a Grade II* listed building.

At the point of foundation, the university was required to provide for the local community. This mission was behind the creation of the Department of Extra-Mural Adult Education in 1924 to provide courses to the local community. This mission continues today; a new admissions policy specifically caters to the 'BS' postcode area of Bristol.

Among the famous names associated with Bristol in this early period is Paul Dirac, who graduated in 1921 with a degree in engineering, before obtaining a second degree in mathematics in 1923 from Cambridge. For his subsequent pioneering work on quantum mechanics, he was awarded the 1933 Nobel Prize for Physics. Later in the 1920s, the H.H. Wills Physics Laboratory was opened by Ernest Rutherford. It has since housed several Nobel Prize winners: Cecil Frank Powell (1950); Hans Albrecht Bethe (1967); and Sir Nevill Francis Mott (1977). The laboratory stands on the same site today, close to the Bristol Grammar School and the city museum.

Sir Winston Churchill became the university's third chancellor in 1929, serving the university in that capacity until 1965. He succeeded Richard Haldane who had held the office from 1912 following the death of Henry Wills.

During World War II, the Wills Memorial was bombed, destroying the Great Hall and the organ it housed, along with 7,000 books removed from King's College London for safe keeping.  It has since been restored, complete with oak panelled walls and a new organ.

Post-war development 

In 1946, the university established the first drama department in the country. In the same year, Bristol began offering special entrance exams and grants to aid the resettlement of servicemen returning home. Student numbers continued to increase, and the Faculty of Engineering eventually needed the new premises that were to become Queen's Building in 1955. This substantial building housed all of the university's engineers until 1996, when the electrical engineering and computer science departments moved over the road into the new Merchant Venturers' Building to make space for these rapidly expanding fields. Today, Queen's Building caters for most of the teaching needs of the faculty and provides academic space for the "heavy" engineering subjects (civil, mechanical, and aerospace).

With unprecedented growth in the 1960s, particularly in undergraduate numbers, the Students' Union eventually acquired larger premises in a new building in the Clifton area of the city, in 1965. This building was more spacious than the Victoria Rooms, which were now given over to the Department of Music. The University of Bristol Union provides many practice and performance rooms, some specialist rooms, as well as three bars: Bar 100, the Mandela (also known as AR2) and the Avon Gorge. Whilst spacious, the Union building is thought by many to be ugly and out of character compared to the architecture of the rest of the Clifton area, having been mentioned in a BBC poll to find the worst architectural eyesores in Britain. The university has proposed relocating the Union to a more central location as part of its development 'masterplan'. More recently, plans for redevelopment of the current building have been proposed.

The 1960s were a time of considerable student activism in the United Kingdom, and Bristol was no exception. In 1968, many students marched in support of the Anderson Report, which called for higher student grants. This discontent culminated in an 11-day sit-in at the Senate House (the administrative headquarters of the university). A series of chancellors and vice-chancellors led the university through these decades, with Henry Somerset, 10th Duke of Beaufort taking over from Churchill as chancellor in 1965 before being succeeded by Dorothy Hodgkin in 1970 who spent the next 18 years in the office.

As the age of mass higher education dawned, Bristol continued to build its student numbers. The various undergraduate residences were repeatedly expanded and, more recently, some postgraduate residences have been constructed. These more recent ventures have been funded (and are run) by external companies in agreement with the university.

One of the few centres for deaf studies in the United Kingdom was established in Bristol in 1981, followed in 1988 by the Norah Fry Centre for research into learning difficulties. Also in 1988, and again in 2004, the Students' Union AGM voted to disaffiliate from the National Union of Students (NUS). On both occasions, however, the subsequent referendum of all students reversed that decision and Bristol remains affiliated to the NUS.

In 1988, Sir Jeremy Morse, then chairman of Lloyds Bank, became chancellor.

21st century 

As the number of postgraduate students has grown (particularly the numbers pursuing taught master's degrees), there eventually became a need for separate representation on university bodies and the Postgraduate Union (PGU) was established in 2000.
Universities are increasingly expected to exploit the intellectual property generated by their research activities and, in 2000, Bristol established the Research and Enterprise Division (RED) to further this cause (particularly for technology-based businesses). In 2001, the university signed a 25-year research funding deal with IP2IPO, an intellectual property commercialisation company. In 2007, research activities were expanded further with the opening of the Advanced Composites Centre for Innovation and Science (ACCIS) and The Bristol Institute for Public Affairs (BIPA).

In 2002, the university was involved in an argument over press intrusion after details of then-prime minister Tony Blair's son's application to university were published in national newspapers. In the same year, the university opened the new Centre for Sports, Exercise and Health in the heart of the university precinct. At a cost, local residents are also able to use the facilities.

Brenda Hale, the first female Law Lord, became chancellor of the university in 2003. Sir Paul Nurse succeeded Lady Hale as chancellor on 1 January 2017.

Expansion of teaching and research activities continues. In 2004, the Faculty of Engineering completed work on the Bristol Laboratory for Advanced Dynamics Engineering (BLADE). This £18.5m project is intended to further the study of dynamics and is the most advanced such facility in Europe. It was built as an extension to the Queen's Building and was officially opened by Queen Elizabeth II in March 2005.

In January 2005, the School of Chemistry was awarded £4.5m by the Higher Education Funding Council for England to create Bristol ChemLabS: a Centre for Excellence in Teaching & Learning (CETL), with an additional £350k announced for the capital part of the project in February 2006. Bristol ChemLabS stands for Bristol Chemical Laboratory Sciences; it is the only chemistry CETL in the UK.

September 2009 saw the opening of the university's Centre for Nanoscience and Quantum Information. This £11 million building is known as the quietest building in the world and has other technologically sophisticated features such as self-cleaning glass. Advanced research into quantum computing, nanotechnology, materials and other disciplines are being undertaken in the building.

There is also a plan to significantly redevelop the centre of the University Precinct in the coming years. The first step began in September 2011, with the start of construction of a state-of-the-art Life Sciences building.

In 2018 while building work was underway in the Fry Building, the building caught fire.

In 2018 the University of Bristol Students' Union (Bristol SU) adopted a motion that banned trans-exclusionary radical feminists (TERFs) from appearing as speakers at Bristol SU events and that called upon the university to adopt the same policy. The motion said the TERF ban was necessary because TERF activity on the university campus "put[s] trans students’ safety at risk ... in direct violation of the aims outlined in the Code of Conduct".

In February 2021, University of Bristol professor David Miller called for the "end of Zionism", said that Israel is "trying to exert its will all over the world" and called members of the University of Bristol Jewish Society “political pawns by a violent, racist foreign regime", comments that the All-Party Parliamentary Group Against Anti-Semitism deemed to "incit[e] hatred against Jewish students". On 17 March, the university announced that it had begun an investigation of Miller, and observed that it did not endorse his remarks. The Avon and Somerset Police announced about a week later that they had opened a hate crime investigation. Miller's employment at the university was terminated "with immediate effect" at the beginning of October 2021.

In 2021, Raquel Rosario-Sánchez, a Dominican graduate student at Bristol who had attended meetings of feminist groups that opposed allowing trans women into female-only spaces, filed a civil action against Bristol University; Rosario-Sánchez alleges that she was the victim of a campaign of bullying and abuse against her by other members of the university, and that the university failed to protect her because it was afraid of upsetting trans-rights activists. The case went to trial in February 2022. The judgment was delivered in April 2022. The judge acknowledged that she had been subject to threats of violence, but dismissed all her claims, saying that there had been no actionable breach of duty by the university. He said that his ruling focused on how the university managed her complaints rather than any judgment about gender rights. In February 2023, following its previous disciplinary action against Rosario-Sánchez and the Women Talk Back group, it emerged that the Bristol Students Union has agreed out-of-court that "affiliated clubs and societies may lawfully offer single-sex services and be constituted as single-sex associations".

Campus

Buildings and sites 

The university does not have a main campus but is spread over a considerable geographic area. Most of its activities, however, are concentrated in the area of the city centre, referred to as the "University Precinct".

Some of the University of Bristol's buildings date to its pre-charter days when it was University College Bristol. These buildings were designed by Charles Hansom, and suffered being built in stages due to financial pressure. The first large scale building project the University of Bristol undertook on gaining a charter was the Wills Memorial Building. The armorials on the Founder's Window represent all of the interests present at the founding of the University of Bristol including the Wills and Fry families. Other notable buildings and sites include Royal Fort House, the University of Bristol Botanic Garden, many large Victorian houses which were converted for teaching in the Faculty of Arts, and the Victoria Rooms which house the Music Department and were designed by Charles Dyer. The tympanum of the building depicts a scene from The Advent of Morning designed by Jabez Tyley.

Goldney gardens entered the property of the University of Bristol through George Wills who had hoped to build an all-male hall of residence there. This was prevented due to the moral objection of the then warden of Clifton Hill House who objected to the idea of male and female residences being in such close proximity. University records show that Miss Starvey was prepared to resign over the issue and that she had the support of the then Chancellor Conwy Lloyd Morgan. Eventually land was purchased in Stoke Bishop, allowing the building of what has been described as a "quasi-Oxbridge" hall, Wills Hall, to which was added the Dame Monica Wills Chapel by George Wills' widow after his death. When Goldney did become student accommodation in 1956, the flats were designed by Michael Grice who received an award from the Civic Trust for their design.

Burwalls, a mansion house on the other side of the Avon Gorge, was used as a halls of residence in the past and was a home of Sir George Oatley. The building is now used to house the Centre for Continuing Education.

Many of the more modern buildings, including Senate House and the newer parts of the HH Wills Physics Laboratory, were designed by Ralph Brentnall using funds from the University Grants Committee. He is also responsible for the extension to the Wills Memorial Building library which was completed to such standard that few now realise that is an extension to the original building.

In May 2022, the university announced the opening of the Gambling Harms and Research Centre (GHRC). The centre worth £4 million aims to increase awareness and understanding of the dangers of gambling. The project was funded by the GambleAware charity, which chose the university for its history in researching gambling issues, and will integrate research from six facilities.

Planned expansion 

In November 2016, the university announced that it plans to build a £300 million Temple Quarter Campus for c. 5,000 students, next to Bristol Temple Meads railway station within Bristol Temple Quarter Enterprise Zone. The new campus, which will include a business school, digital research facilities and a student village, is expected to open in 2021. For the existing campus, there are plans to remodel Tyndall Avenue, pedestrianise the surrounding area and build a new library and resource hub.

Organisation and governance 

In common with most UK universities, Bristol is headed formally by the chancellor, currently Sir Paul Nurse and led on a day-to-day basis by the vice-chancellor, currently Professor Evelyn Welch, who is the academic leader and chief executive. There are four pro vice-chancellors and three ceremonial pro-chancellors. The chancellor may hold office for up to ten years and the pro-chancellors for up to three, unless the University Court determines otherwise, but the vice-chancellor and pro-vice-chancellors have no term limits. The vice-chancellor is supported by a deputy vice-chancellor.

Responsibility for running the university is held at an executive level by the vice-chancellor, but the council is the only body that can recommend changes to the university's statutes and charter, with the exception of academic ordinances. These can only be made with the consent of the senate, the chief academic body in the university which also holds responsibility for teaching and learning, examinations and research and enterprise. The chancellor and pro chancellors are nominated by council and appointed formally by court, whose additional powers are now limited to these appointments and a few others, including some lay members of council. Finally, Convocation, the body of all staff, ceremonial officers and graduates of the university, returns 100 members to court and one member to council, but is otherwise principally a forum for discussion and to ensure graduates stay in touch with the university.

The university is made up of a number of schools and departments organised into six faculties:

Faculty of Arts 
 School of Arts
 Anthropology and Archaeology
 Film and Television
 Music
 Philosophy
 Theatre (see also the University of Bristol Theatre Collection)
 School of Humanities
 Classics and Ancient History
 English
 History 
 History of Art 
 Religion and Theology
 School of Modern Languages
 French
 German
 Hispanic, Portuguese and Latin American Studies
 Italian
 Russian
 Centre for English Language and Foundation Studies
 Centre for Innovation

Faculty of Engineering 
 School of Computer Science, Electrical and Electronic Engineering, and Engineering Mathematics
 Computer Science
 Electrical & Electronic Engineering
 Engineering Mathematics
 School of Civil, Aerospace and Mechanical Engineering
 Aerospace Engineering
 Civil Engineering
 Mechanical Engineering
 Engineering Design
 Engineering with Management

Faculty of Life Sciences 
 School of Biological Sciences
 School of Biochemistry
 School of Cellular and Molecular Medicine
 School of Physiology, Pharmacology and Neuroscience
 School of Psychological Science

Faculty of Science 
 School of Chemistry
 School of Earth Sciences
 School of Geographical Sciences
 School of Mathematics
 School of Physics
 Centre for Device Thermography and Reliability
 Centre for Nanoscience & Quantum Information
 Interface Analysis Centre

Faculty of Health Sciences 
 Bristol Dental School
 Bristol Medical School
 Population Health Sciences
 Translational Health Sciences
 Bristol Veterinary School
 Centre for Health Sciences Education
 Centre for Applied Anatomy
 Master's in Teaching and Learning for Health Professionals

Faculty of Social Sciences and Law 
 School of Education
 School for Policy Studies
 School of Economics
Centre for Market and Public Organisation
 School of Sociology, Politics and International Studies
 University of Bristol Business School
 University of Bristol Law School

Academic dress 

The university specifies a mix of Cambridge and Oxford academic dress. For the most part, it uses Oxford-style gowns and Cambridge-style hoods, which are required to be 'university red' (see the logo at the top of the page).

Logo and arms 

In 2004, the university unveiled its new crest. The icons in the crest are the sun for the Wills family, the dolphin for Colston, the horse for Fry and the ship-and-castle from the medieval seal of the City of Bristol, as also used in the coat of arms. The shape of the whole crest represents the open book of learning. This crest has replaced the university arms shown, but the arms continue to be used where there is a specific historical or ceremonial requirement. The arms comprise:

The inscription on the book is the Latin opening of the 124th Psalm, "If the Lord Himself had not (been on our side...)". The latin motto granted with the Arms below the shields is Vim promovet insitam, from the fourth Ode of Horace's fourth book meaning '[Learning] promotes one's innate power'.

Academics

Admissions 

Bristol had the 8th highest average entry qualification for undergraduates of any UK university in 2015, with new students averaging 485 UCAS points, equivalent to just above AAAaa in A-level grades. Competition for places is high with an average 7.7 applications per place according to the 2014 Sunday Times League Tables, making it the joint 11th most competitive university in the UK. The university gives offers of admission to 67.3% of its applicants, the 8th lowest amongst the Russell Group.

According to the 2017 Times and Sunday Times Good University Guide, approximately 40% of Bristol's undergraduates come from independent schools. In the 2016–17 academic year, the university had a domicile breakdown of 78:5:17 of UK:EU:non-EU students respectively with a female to male ratio of 55:45.

Rankings and reputation

Internationally, the 2021 QS World University Rankings placed Bristol at 58th overall in the world and 9th in the UK. The 2021 QS World University Rankings for Graduate Employability also placed Bristol at 58th in the world and 9th in the UK in terms of reputation with employers. Bristol was chosen as the ninth best university in the UK for the quality of graduates according to recruiters from the UK's major companies in 2015. The Times Higher Education World University Ranking placed Bristol at 87th globally and 10th in the UK in 2020. Another international ranking, the Shanghai Jiao Tong University Academic Ranking of World Universities, placed Bristol 64th globally and 8th in the UK in 2019. Bristol is ranked 47th in the world (and 6th in the UK) in the 2016 Round University Ranking. The 2017 U.S. News & World Report ranks Bristol 76th in the world. In 2019, it ranked 120th among the universities around the world by SCImago Institutions Rankings.

Within the UK, Bristol was ranked 10th overall in The Sunday Times 10-year (1998–2007) average ranking of British universities based on consistent league table performance, and is a member of the 'Sutton 13' of top-ranked universities in the UK. According to data published in The Sunday Times, Bristol has the sixth-highest percentage of "good honours" of any UK university. In the 2010 Centre for Higher Education's Development's Excellence Rankings, Bristol is one of only four UK universities (Oxford, UCL and Manchester) to be rated Excellent in all seven departments. The University of Bristol was the second most targeted university by the UK's top 100 employers, according to the Graduate Market in 2019 report produced by High Fliers.

In The Complete University Guide 2013, Bristol ranked fifth for German, fourth for Russian, third for mechanical and civil engineering, third for music and second for drama.

Degrees 
Bristol awards a range of academic degrees spanning bachelor's and master's degrees as well as junior doctorates and higher doctorates. The postnominals awarded are the degree abbreviations used commonly among British universities. The university is part of the Engineering Doctorate scheme, and awards the Eng. D. in systems engineering, engineering management, aerospace engineering and non-destructive evaluation.

Bristol notably does not award by title any bachelor's degrees in music, which is available for study but awarded BA (although it does award MMus and DMus), nor any degree in divinity, since divinity is not available for study (students of theology are awarded a BA). Similarly, the university does not award BLitt (Bachelor of Letters), although it does award both MLitt and DLitt. In regulations, the university does not name MD or DDS as higher doctorates, although they are in many universities as these degrees are normally accredited professional doctorates.

The degrees of DLitt, DSc, DEng, LLD and DMus, whilst having regulations specifying the grounds for award, are most often conferred as honorary degrees (in honoris causa). Those used most commonly are the DLitt, DSc and LLD, with the MA (and occasionally the MLitt) also sometimes conferred honorarily for distinction in the local area or within the university.

Publishing and commercial activities 
University of Bristol has various activities including publication, joint ventures, and catering and accommodation services.

Bristol University Press 
Bristol University Press is scholarly press based at University of Bristol. In 1996, the University of Bristol established Policy Press, an academic publisher based in the Faculty of Social Sciences and Law at the University of Bristol and specialising in the social sciences.  In October 2016, Policy Press became an imprint of newly founded  Bristol University Press.

It is not-for-profit university press which publishes 15 journals and 200 books a year in subjects including: Ageing and Gerontology, Business and Management, Criminology, Economics and Society, Environment and Sustainability, International Development, Law, Politics and International Relations, Science, Technology and Society, and Sociology. It achieved journal citation metrics with gains in Journal Impact Factors and improved results in Journal Citation Indicator, Scopus CiteScore and SJR.

Bristol is Open 
Bristol is Open, abbreviated as BiO, is a joint venture project between Bristol City Council and University of Bristol. It is for delivering research contributing to the development of a Smart City and deploying a city-scale open and programmable testbed for experimentation and digital innovation. The collaboration of two organisations started in April 2015 and ended in December 2019 with Bristol City Council taking full control of BiO’s operations. It has completed many technical trials and experiments including open access to Wi-Fi as a reduction of the digital divide and development for Smart City technology.

Student life

Students' Union 

The University of Bristol Students' Union (Bristol SU) located on Queen's Road in the Richmond Building is a founding member of the National Union of Students and is amongst the oldest students' unions in England. The union oversees three media outlets: UBTV, the Bristol University Radio Station (BURST) and the student newspaper Epigram. There is also a local branch of The Tab. The Union is responsible for representing students' academic interests through elections of student representatives and democratic events. The Union is also responsible for the organisation of the annual Welcome Fair, the co-ordination of Bristol Student Community Action, which organises volunteering projects in the local community, and the organisation of entertainment events and over 400 student groups, societies and clubs. Previous presidents have included Sue Lawley and former Liberal Democrat MP Lembit Öpik. There is a separate union for postgraduate students, as well as an athletic union, which is a member of the British Universities & Colleges Sport. In distinction to the "blues" awarded for sporting excellence at Oxford and Cambridge, Bristol's most successful athletes are awarded "reds".

Halls of residence 

Accommodation for students is primarily in the central precinct of the university and two areas of Bristol: Clifton and Stoke Bishop, known respectively as the West and North Villages.

In Stoke Bishop, Wills Hall on the edge of the Clifton Downs was the first to be opened, in 1929, by the then chancellor, Winston Churchill. Its original quadrangle layout has been expanded twice, in 1962 and 1990. Churchill Hall, named for the chancellor, followed in 1956, then Badock Hall in 1964. At the time of Badock Hall's establishment, some of the buildings were called Hiatt Baker Hall, but two years later, Hiatt Baker moved to its own site and is now the largest hall in the university. The first self-catering hall in Stoke Bishop was University Hall, established in 1971 with expansion in 1992.

In Clifton, Goldney Hall was built first in the early 18th century by the wealthy merchant Goldney family and eventually became part of the university in 1956. It is a popular location for filming, with The Chronicles of Narnia, The House of Eliott and Truly, Madly, Deeply, as well as episodes of Only Fools and Horses and Casualty, being filmed there. The Grotto in the grounds is a Grade I listed building. Clifton Hill House is another Grade I listed building now used as student accommodation in Clifton. The original building was constructed between 1745 and 1750 by Isaac Ware, and has been used by the university since its earliest days in 1909. Manor Hall comprises five separate buildings, the principal of which was erected from 1927 to 1932 to the design of George Oatley following a donation from Henry Herbert Wills. Manor Hall houses the largest and most dated rooms, some dating back to the early 20th century. One of its annexes, Manor House, has recently been refurbished and officially 'reopened' in 1999. 

On the central precinct sits The Hawthorns, a student house accommodating 115 undergraduate students. The house started life as a collection of villas built somewhere between 1888 and 1924 that were later converted, bit by bit, into a hotel by John Dingle. The Hawthorns also houses conferencing facilities, the staff refectory and bar, the Accommodation Office and the Student Houses Office. 33 Colston Street was opened in the city centre in October 2011 after the university acquired the property in 2009. Several of the residences in the central precinct are more recent and have been built and are managed by third-party organisations under exclusivity arrangements with the university. These include New Bridewell House, opened in 2016, which is in the former police HQ, it includes en-suite bedrooms and studios and is operated by Fresh Student Housing, Unite House and Chantry Court, opened in 2000 and 2003 respectively by the UNITE Group, as well as Dean's Court (2001, postgraduates only) and Woodland Court (2005), both run by the Dominion Housing Group.

All of the main halls elect groups of students to the Junior Common Room to organise the halls social calendar for the next year. Residents of student houses, private accommodation and students living at home become members of Orbital – a society organising social events for students throughout the year.

Sport
The University of Bristol has a rich heritage and reputation for sports. Sports membership at Bristol University totals up to 4,000 students across a wide range of unique teams and individual pursuits. Its network of over 70 sports clubs and four sites are run by the university's Student Union and its Sport,Exercise and Health Department. Competing with other universities in the British Universities and Colleges Sport league (BUCS), Bristol university is placed 8th in the country.

The university caters to its students with sporting facilities split across four primary complexes:

Bristol University Indoor Sports Centre- The Indoor Sports Centre is located at the heart of the university campus and is home to a fully equipped two-storey gym, fitness studios, sports hall and Sports Medicine Clinic.

Coombe Dingle Sports Complex- This 38-acre site in the heart of Stoke Bishop, features the only indoor tennis centre in Bristol and is where the university's more traditional outdoor sports reside. Coombe Dingle is typically used for training and competition. Throughout the year Coombe Dingle hosts a variety of competitive fixtures, including inter-university BUCS matches, plus local and national league matches.:

Facilities available at Coombe Dingle Sports Complex:
•	3G pitch
•	Artificial pitches (sand dressed and floodlit)
•	Grass pitches (football and rugby)
•	Cricket squares and nets (including grass)
•	Tennis courts, indoor and outdoor (floodlit)
•	Lacrosse pitch
•	Netball courts (outdoor)
•	Olympic weight lifting gym
•	Softball and rounders facilities
•	Pavilion, lounge bar and meeting rooms
•	Sports Medicine Clinic

Richmond Building- The university swimming pool is located inside the student union (Richmond Building). This six-lane swimming pool has a moveable bulkhead, creating a competition-length main pool, alongside a comfortable teaching pool for lessons. The pool is available to students, staff and the community for lane and casual swimming, or lessons, on a membership or pay-as-you-go basis.

Saltford Boathouse- The University Boathouse is based at Saltford, halfway to Bath on the River Avon. 
Used for term-time training/competition and out-of-term recreational water sport, the Boathouse moors up the universities rowing and sailing boats.

Controversy

2003 admissions controversy 

The university has been regarded as being elitist by some commentators, taking 41% of its undergraduate students from non-state schools, according to the most recent 2009/2010 figures, despite the fact that such pupils make up just 7% of the population and 18% of 16+ year old pupils across the UK. The intake of state school pupils at Bristol is lower than many Oxbridge colleges. The high ratio of undergraduates from non-state school has led to some tension at the university. In late February and early March 2003, Bristol became embroiled in a row about admissions policies, with some private schools threatening a boycott based on their claims that, in an effort to improve equality of access, the university was discriminating against their students. These claims were hotly denied by the university.
In August 2005, following a large-scale survey, the Independent Schools Council publicly acknowledged that there was no evidence of bias against applicants from the schools it represented. In 2016, the 93% Club was established at Bristol University after students from a working-class state-school were criticised for their background and upbringing.

The university has a new admissions policy, which lays out in considerable detail the basis on which any greater or lesser weight may be given to particular parts of an applicant's backgrounds – in particular, what account may be taken of which school the applicant hails from. This new policy also encourages greater participation from locally resident applicants.

Simon Hall and Bristol Innocence Project 

In the late 2000s, Bristol law students in the University of Bristol Innocence Project (UoBIP) wrongly campaigned for a convicted murderer, who later went on to formally confess to the murder he was convicted of and prove he was rightly convicted. The students helped produce a Rough Justice programme promoting his false claims of innocence, and continued to assert he had been wrongly convicted even after his appeal was rejected in 2011. In 2013, Hall confessed to the crime to police and dropped his appeals, and one year later was found dead in an act of suicide. His case was described as an embarrassment for such 'miscarriage of justice' activists and greatly undermined the claims of many prisoners who claim their innocence.

Student Mental Health Crisis 

In November 2016, three first-year students died within a few weeks of joining the university. All three deaths were suspected suicides. The Guardian attributed the deaths to a mental health crisis caused by academic and social pressure. Between October 2016 and January 2018, seven students died by suicide. In May 2018, three students died suddenly during exam season. The university has received increasing criticism for its handling of these deaths and confirmed suicides. In March 2017, it was reported that five students committed suicide in the 2016/2017 academic year. Between August 2017 to 2019, a reported 11 university students committed suicide. A further student suicide was reported in August 2019.

In September 2017, the university spent £1 million on well-being advisers following a string of students suicides.

In April 2018, a suicidal student, Natasha Abrahart, also died by suicide after not having her anti-depressants for a month. The student in question was found dead on the day she was due to take a "terrifying" oral exam. The coroner criticised the Avon and Wiltshire Mental Health Partnership NHS Trust whilst her parents blamed the university for lack of measures for her during the six-month period she was struggling. In 2019, her parents were due to sue the university after the suicide. The case was heard at Bristol County Court in March 2022. Judgment was given in May 2022. The judge found that the university had breached its duties under the Equality Act to make reasonable adjustments for disability in the way it had assessed Natasha Abrahart, and had treated her unfavourably. He awarded her parents £50,000 in damages.

Another death by suicide, James Murray, occurred in May 2018. He had been dismissed from his course in February 2018 due to lack of attendance.

Around late 2018, the university launched a new opt-in emergency contact system for students' parents, friends and guardians. The system, which was pressurised by the parents of Murray, alerts those concerned if the student if there were severe concerns about their wellbeing. The system, in which 94% of students opted in, was used 36 times in its first year. The former vice-chancellor Hugh Brady, in February 2018, blamed the social media and "the cult of perfectionism" for the mental health crisis among young people following a string of student suicides.

In 2019, students who attended a course based around the "science of happiness" by the university was found to have "significantly higher mental wellbeing than a control group". The course has both academic and practical elements and give academic credits with no exams. However, those who took the course online during the COVID-19 pandemic did not feel happier but were more resilient than a control group. In addition there were certain caveats as most participants were white women.

Notable people

Academics 
Current academics at the University of Bristol include 21 fellows of the Academy of Medical Sciences, 13 fellows of the British Academy, 13 fellows of the Royal Academy of Engineering and 44 fellows of the Royal Society. These include, Sir Michael Berry, one of the discoverers of quantum mechanics' "geometric phase", John Rarity international expert on quantum optics, quantum cryptography and quantum communication, David May, computer scientist and lead architect for the transputer, Mark Horton, a British maritime and historical archaeologist and Bruce Hood, a world-leading experimental psychologist.

Academics in computer science include, David Cliff, inventor of the seminal "ZIP" trading algorithm, Peter Flach, Mike Fraser, professor of human-computer interaction, Julian Gough and Nigel Smart. Academics in engineering include the materials scientist Stephen Eichhorn.

Past academics of the university include, Patricia Broadfoot, vice-chancellor of the University of Gloucestershire, Nigel Thrift, vice-chancellor of the University of Warwick, and Wendy Larner, provost of Victoria University of Wellington. Anthony Epstein, co-discoverer of the Epstein-Barr virus, was Professor of Pathology at the university from 1968 to 1982, Sir John Lennard-Jones, discoverer of the Lennard-Jones potential in physics and Alfred Marshall, one of the University College's principals and influential economist in the latter part of the 19th century. Mathematicians and philosophers Rohit Parikh and Brian Rotman lectured in the mathematics department, and philosophers of science Paul Feyerabend and Alexander Bird taught in the department of philosophy. Another notable current academic in the department of philosophy includes Havi Carel. Notable mathematicians who have worked in the department of mathematics include Hannes Leitgeb, Philip Welch, Ben Green, Andrew Booker, Julia Wolf, Jens Marklof, John McNamara, Howell Peregrine, Christopher Budd John Hogan, Jeremy Rickard, Richard Jozsa, Corinna Ulcigrai, David Evans and the statistician Harvey Goldstein.

The University of Bristol is associated with three Ig Nobel Prizes, an award for unusual or trivial achievements in scientific research. Sir Michael Berry shared the award (with Andre Geim, a Nobel Laureate) for using magnets to levitate a frog. Gareth Jones also shared an Ig Nobel prize for scientifically documenting fellatio in fruit bats. Dr. Len Fisher was awarded the 1999 prize for physics for calculating the optimal way to dunk a biscuit.

Alumni 

Bristol alumnus Paul Dirac went on to win the Nobel Prize in Physics in 1933 for his contribution to the formulation of quantum mechanics and is considered one of the most significant physicists of the 20th century. Other notable scientists include Dani Rabaiotti, an environmental scientist and science communicator, and Eliahu Nissim, a professor of aeronautical engineering, and the president of the Open University of Israel.

Writers to have studied at Bristol include Dick King-Smith, Sarah Kane, Angela Carter, Dorothy Simpson, David Gibbins, Julia Donaldson, Olivier award-winning playwright Laura Wade, and David Nicholls, author of the novel Starter for Ten, turned into a screenplay set in the University of Bristol.

In government and politics, notable alumni include Albert II, Prince of Monaco, former Liberal Democrat MP Lembit Öpik, who was president of Bristol University Students' Union during his time, Sir Jonathan Evans,  former head of MI5, Nkosazana Dlamini-Zuma, Chairperson of the African Union Commission from October 2012 to January 2017, and Paul Boateng, the UK's first Black Cabinet Minister.

In current affairs, former students include journalist and McMafia author Misha Glenny, BBC News Chief Political Correspondent James Landale (who founded the university independent newspaper Epigram), author and journalist Julie Myerson, editor-in-chief of the Telegraph Media Group William Lewis, editor-in-chief of The Observer Will Hutton, Radio 4 presenter Sue Lawley, newsreader Alastair Stewart, and Sky News US Correspondent Dominic Waghorn. BBC Breakfast and Good Morning Britain anchor Susanna Reid was an editor of Epigram.

In entertainment, former students include rapper Shygirl, singer James Blunt, illusionist Derren Brown, comedians Jon Richardson, Marcus Brigstocke (who did not graduate), Matt Lucas and David Walliams, actors Simon Pegg,  Chris Langham and Pearl Mackie, anime YouTuber Gigguk, Brass Eye creator Chris Morris and Stath Lets Flats creator Jamie Demetriou.

Notable alumni from the Film and Television Production department include film directors Mick Jackson, Michael Winterbottom, Marc Evans, Christopher Smith, Alex Cox, Peter Webber and Maddie Moate.

Other alumni include Anne McClain, member of the 2013 NASA Astronaut Class, mathematician Iain Gordon, long jumper Jazmin Sawyers, Luke Bond, an organist at Windsor Castle, and baker Kim-Joy Hewlett, amongst many others.

Gallery

See also 
 Armorial of UK universities
 CHOMBEC
 Education in Bristol
 List of modern universities in Europe (1801–1945)
 List of universities in the United Kingdom
 University of Bristol Theatre Collection

Notes

References

Further reading

External links 

 
  of the University Students' Union

 
Educational institutions established in 1909
Russell Group
1909 establishments in England
Universities UK